Psenes maculatus is a species of Perciformes in the family Nomeidae.

References 

Nomeidae
Animals described in 1880